Hedda's Revenge is a 1919 German silent film directed by Jaap Speyer.

Cast
In alphabetical order

References

Bibliography

External links

1919 films
Films of the Weimar Republic
Films directed by Jaap Speyer
German silent feature films
German black-and-white films
1910s German films